José María Sánchez-Ventura y Pascual (28 September 1922 – 22 May 2017) was a Spanish politician who served as Minister of Justice of Spain in 1975, during the Francoist dictatorship.

References

1922 births
2017 deaths
Justice ministers of Spain
Government ministers during the Francoist dictatorship